Versailleux is a commune in the Ain department in eastern France.

On 23 February 2006 during the epidemic of avian influenza, a great number of turkeys died in a breeding of 11,000 animals, probably because of the virus H5N1. The turkeys had never left it because the breeding was confined. The commune of Joyeux, in which the first French case was detected on 13 February, is located a few kilometres south.

Population

See also
 Dombes
Communes of the Ain department

References

External links

Dombes and Versailleux

Communes of Ain
Ain communes articles needing translation from French Wikipedia